Tecmo World Cup '93 is a soccer video game released in 1993 by Sega for the Master System. The game is a continuation of previous Tecmo football games such as Tecmo World Cup '90 and Tecmo World Cup '92.

Gameplay
The game replicates matches of football with the option of 45, 30 or 15 minutes per half. In multiplayer two human players can play each other. Single Player has a world cup tournament consisting of a group stage, second round, quarter finals, semi finals and final.

The player can select one from twenty-four available national teams.

References

External links
SMS Power - Tecmo World Cup '93
Tecmo World Cup '93 (video game) at GiantBomb.com

1993 video games
Association football video games
Europe-exclusive video games
Master System games
Master System-only games
Tecmo games
SIMS Co., Ltd. games
Sega video games
Video games developed in Japan